Carl McNally Pickens (born March 23, 1970) is an American former professional football player who was a wide receiver in the National Football League (NFL) for the Cincinnati Bengals and Tennessee Titans.

Early life
Pickens attended Murphy High School in Murphy, North Carolina, a small town in the Smoky Mountains about 100 miles from Knoxville, Tennessee. He played free safety and wide receiver there, intercepting 15 passes in three seasons and catching 71 passes, including 24 for touchdowns, as a senior, when he was a Parade magazine All-American. He also returned punts and kickoffs, and punted. He also excelled at basketball, averaging 27 points per game and attracting the interest of many college programs.

College career
Pickens played college football for the University of Tennessee from 1989–1991, where he started his career as a safety and was named a Freshman All-American and All-SEC selection. He then moved to wide receiver, where he caught 109 passes for 1,875 yards and 13 touchdowns, and made the College Football All-America Team as a junior. He did not return to Tennessee for his senior year. His college receiving statistics were:
1989: 7 catches for 81 yards with 2 TD
1990: 53 catches for 917 yards with 6 TD
1991: 49 catches for 877 yards with 5 TD

Professional career

Cincinnati Bengals
Pickens was selected in the second round (31st overall) of the 1992 NFL Draft by the Cincinnati Bengals.

In 1992, he was named the NFL Offensive Rookie of the Year by the Associated Press. In 1995, he set a Bengals record for receptions in a single season with 99, and touchdown catches with 17. He later surpassed his own record by recording 100 receptions in 1996. From 1994-1995, Pickens became the first NFL player to record at least five receptions and a receiving touchdown in eight straight games. In his nine NFL seasons, Pickens recorded 540 receptions for 7,129 yards and 63 touchdowns, while also gaining another 307 yards and one touchdown on punt returns. His 63 touchdown receptions were a franchise record until surpassed by Chad Johnson in 2010.

He is also known for the "Carl Pickens Clause". This was a loyalty clause that the Bengals created and added to Pickens's contract which would cause him to forfeit all or some of his signing bonus if he insulted the organization in public. This clause has since been used in contracts with other players.

Tennessee Titans
Pickens moved on from the Cincinnati Bengals before the start of the 2000 season, instead joining the Tennessee Titans. He would play only one season for the Titans.

Dallas Cowboys
On April 5, 2001, Pickens signed as a free agent with the Dallas Cowboys. He announced his retirement on May 30.

NFL career statistics

Personal life
Pickens was arrested January 5, 2014 for allegedly assaulting his wife after the two argued on a movie date.

References

1970 births
Living people
African-American players of American football
American football wide receivers
Tennessee Volunteers football players
Cincinnati Bengals players
Tennessee Titans players
American Conference Pro Bowl players
National Football League Offensive Rookie of the Year Award winners
People from Murphy, North Carolina
21st-century African-American sportspeople
20th-century African-American sportspeople